About is a French surname. Notable people with the surname include:

 Edmond François Valentin About (1828–1885), French novelist, publicist, and journalist
 Nicolas About (born 1947), French politician

French-language surnames